Matjaž Krušec is a Slovenian figure skating official and former competitor for Yugoslavia. He competed at the 1979 World Championships and four European Championships. He has served as an International Skating Union referee and international technical controller. He is the former president of the Stanko Bloudek Figure and Roller Skating Club in Ljubljana.

Competitive highlights

References 

Figure skating officials
Slovenian male single skaters
Yugoslav male single skaters
Living people
Sportspeople from Ljubljana
Year of birth missing (living people)